Analyta apicalis is a moth in the family Crambidae. It was described by George Hampson in 1896. It is found in India, Sri Lanka and Taiwan.

References

Moths described in 1896
Spilomelinae
Moths of Asia